Prvenci is a roadside village in the Municipality of Markovci in northeastern Slovenia. It was first mentioned in written documents dating to 1322. The area is part of the traditional region of Styria. It is now included with the rest of the municipality in the Drava Statistical Region.

References

External links
Prvenci on Geopedia

Populated places in the Municipality of Markovci